Infanta Philippa of Coimbra (1437–1497) was the youngest child of Infante Peter, Duke of Coimbra, and Isabella of Aragon, Countess of Urgell.

She became a nun in the Convent of Odivelas where she died in 1497.

Ancestry

References
"Nobreza de Portugal e Brasil", Vol. I, page 271. Published by Zairol Lda., Lisbon, 1989

External links
 Genealogical information on Philippa of Coimbra (in Portuguese)

1435 births
1497 deaths
15th-century Portuguese people
15th-century Portuguese women
15th-century Christian nuns